Welke Airport  is a privately-owned, public use airport located on Beaver Island in Charlevoix County, Michigan, United States. Scheduled passenger service to Charlevoix Municipal Airport in Charlevoix, Michigan, is provided by Island Airways.

As per Federal Aviation Administration records, the airport had 16,542 passenger boardings (enplanements) in calendar year 2008, 11,976 enplanements in 2009, and 13,558 in 2010.

Facilities and aircraft

For the 12-month period ending December 31, 2019, the airport had 13,000 aircraft operations, an average of 36 per day: 42% general aviation and 58% air taxi. At that time there were 19 aircraft based at this airport: 12 single-engine, 6 multi-engine and 1 helicopter.

Island Airways operates an FBO at the airport. It offers services such as general maintenance, hangars, and courtesy cars.

Airlines and destinations

Passenger

Accidents and incidents
On September 1, 1995, a pilot and his passenger sustained minor injury after a Grumman AA-5 belonging to a small airline named Conrad Aero crashed during an attempted go-around at Welke Airport. The airplane impacted terrain and was destroyed.
On November 14, 2021, a Britten-Norman BN-2A operated by Island Airways, crashed at Welke, killing four of the five passengers aboard. The only survivor, an 11-year-old girl, was taken to a hospital in Petoskey.

References

External links
 Island Airways
   at Michigan Airport Directory
 Aerial image as of May 1999 from USGS The National Map

Airports in Michigan
Buildings and structures in Charlevoix County, Michigan
Transportation in Charlevoix County, Michigan